is a Japanese politician of the Liberal Democratic Party, a member of the House of Councillors in the Diet (national legislature). A native of Osaka and graduate of the University of Tokyo, he was elected to the House of Councillors for the first time in 1998 after running unsuccessfully for the House of Representatives in 1996. He has recently won two elections for the Japan House of Councilors, Wakayama Prefecture in 2004 and 2010 with 53.83% and 56.79% of the votes respectively.

References

External links 
 Official website in Japanese.

Members of the House of Councillors (Japan)
University of Tokyo alumni
Living people
1967 births
Liberal Democratic Party (Japan) politicians